The 2010–11 Ligue 2 season (known as Ligue 2 Orange for sponsorship reasons) was the 72nd since its establishment. Caen were the defending champions. The fixtures were announced on 22 May 2010 and the season began on 6 August and ended on 27 May 2011. The winter break would be in effect between 22 December and 14 January 2011. There were three promoted teams from the Championnat National, replacing the three teams that were relegated from Ligue 2 following the 2009–10 season. A total of 20 teams currently competes in the league with three clubs suffering relegation to the third division, the Championnat National. All clubs that secured Ligue 2 status for the season were subject to approval by the DNCG before becoming eligible to participate. In addition, German sportswear company Puma, whom the Ligue de Football Professionnel share a partnership with, provided a brand new match ball for the new season.

Teams

Grenoble was the first club to suffer relegation to Ligue 2. The club's impending drop occurred on 10 April 2010 following the team's 4–0 defeat to Toulouse. On 3 May 2010, both US Boulogne and Le Mans were relegated to Ligue 2 following defeats. Le Mans relegation was confirmed following their 3–2 loss away to Nancy, while Boulogne suffered relegation after losing 1–0 to Saint-Étienne, who both Boulogne and Le Mans were trailing. Boulogne's return to Ligue 2 meant a short-lived stay in the highest division. The club had successfully earned promotion to Ligue 1 the previous year. Due to suffering relegation to Ligue 2, Le Mans will unveil their new logo and new name, Le Mans Football Club, as well as their new stadium, MMArena, while playing in the second division.

In the Championnat National, Évian was the first club to achieve promotion to Ligue 2 after defeating Amiens 1–0 on 16 April. On 7 May, Stade Reims made their return to Ligue 2 after one season in the Championnat National following a convincing 4–2 win over Luzenac. With Troyes drawing with Cannes the same day, Reims' second-place position and promotion was secured. The following week, the final club in National achieved promotion to Ligue 2 with Troyes' 2–0 win over Cassis Carnoux.

Teams relegated to Ligue 2
 Le Mans
 Boulogne
 Grenoble

Teams promoted to Ligue 2
 Évian
 Reims
 Troyes

Stadia and locations 

After earning promotion to Ligue 2 for the 2010–11 season, Évian were rumored to be pursuing a move to play their home matches at the Stade de la Praille in Geneva, Switzerland after it was determined that their current facility, the Stade Joseph-Moynat, did not meet the Ligue de Football Professionnel's standards. Thonon-les-Bains, the commune where the club situates itself, is a few kilometers from the Swiss border and is only , a 45-minute car drive, from the city of Geneva. It was reported that the club's president, Patrick Trotignon, had been in the process of advocating for the move since the beginning of the 2009–10 Championnat National season just in case the club had achieved promotion to the second division. The vice-president of Swiss club Servette FC, who occupy the stadium, questioned the move citing possible schedule conflicts, as well as the health of the pitch if both clubs were to use the stadium on a weekly basis. However, his claims were refuted by Benoît Genecand, who serves as president of Fondation du Stade de Genève (FSG), which owns and operates the facility. The club responded immediately to Genecand's comments via a press release posted on the club's official website.

Évian petitioned to the State Council of Geneva and obtained approval from the LFP for the move in early May. On 20 May 2010, Évian received a favorable ruling from the French Football Federation with the Federal Council voting in favor of the move. According to the federation, the move now had to be agreed upon by a UEFA executive committee, which is composed of seventeen officials. On 8 June, UEFA officially denied Évian's request to play at the Stade de la Praille meaning the club will likely play its home matches at the Parc des Sports in nearby Annecy.

1Source
2Temporary facility as current home stadia, the Stade Joseph-Moynat, doesn't meet the LFP's stadium criteria.
3Replaced the Stade Léon-Bollée in January 2011.

Personnel and kits

1 Subject to change during the season.

Managerial changes

In-season

League table

Results

Statistics

Top goalscorers

Last updated: 25 May 2011
Source: Official Goalscorers' Standings

Assists table

Last updated: 25 May 2011
Source: Official Assists' Table

Awards

Yearly 

The nominees for the Ligue 2 Player of the Year, Goalkeeper of the Year, and Manager of the Year. The winners were determine at the annual UNFP Awards, which was held on 22 May. The winners will be displayed in bold.

Ligue 2 Player of the Year

Goalkeeper of the Year

Manager of the Year

Team of the Year

List of 2010–11 transfers

References

External links
 Official site 

Ligue 2 seasons
French
2